Nehal Chudasama (born 22 August 1996) is an Indian model, fitness consultant and beauty pageant titleholder. She also works as an emcee. She was crowned Miss Diva Universe 2018 and represented India at Miss Universe 2018.

Pageantry
In 2018, she auditioned for the title Femina Miss Gujarat, where she was one of the top 3 finalists. Later, the same year, she participated in Miss Diva - 2018 contest and won the title of Miss Diva Universe 2018. She was crowned by outgoing titleholder Shraddha Shashidhar.
She also won the subtitles 'Miss Body Beautiful' and 'Miss Multimedia'. Nehal represented India at the Miss Universe 2018 pageant held on 17 December 2018 in Bangkok, Thailand, but did not make the Top 20.

References

External links

Femina Miss India
Miss Universe 2018 contestants
Indian beauty pageant winners
Female models from Mumbai
1996 births
Living people